Danièle Obono (born 12 July 1980) is a Gabonese-French politician serving as the member of the National Assembly for Paris's 17th constituency since 2017. She has also been the spokesperson for La France Insoumise.

Obono was re-elected in the first round in the 2022 French legislative election.

Early life
Obono was born on 12 July 1980 in Libreville, Gabon. to a prominent Gabonese family. She is the daughter of Hortense Simbou Mbadinga, a secretary at Air Gabon, and Martin Edzodzomo-Ela, an economist who was a senior executive at the Paribas-Gabon bank from 1975 to 1979 before he was dismissed for his opposition to the regime of Omar Bongo, who was also a candidate in the Gabonese presidential election of 1998. She lived in Gabon until she was about ten years old, and she attended university in Montpellier. She became a naturalized French citizen in 2011.

After graduating from university, Obono became a librarian in Paris. In 2003, she started a doctoral program in political science at the Institute of The African World (fr), focusing on social and democratic movements in Nigeria, though she began her political career before completing that degree.

Political career
A member of La France Insoumise, Obono was elected in the legislative election of 2017. She was also the spokesperson for Jean-Luc Mélenchon, together with Alexis Corbière.

In the legislature, Obono has served on the Law Commission, the Commission on European Affairs, and the Foreign Affairs Commission.

In August 2020, the right-wing French magazine Valeurs actuelles published a seven-page fantasy story and illustrations of Obono as a slave in chains facing the sunset, shackled beside a fire, under the title "summer fantasy story", prompting an outcry from politicians of all parties.

References

1980 births
Living people
Deputies of the 15th National Assembly of the French Fifth Republic
La France Insoumise politicians
People from Libreville
French people of Gabonese descent
Black French politicians
Women members of the National Assembly (France)
21st-century French women politicians
Pantheon-Sorbonne University alumni
Deputies of the 16th National Assembly of the French Fifth Republic